Jeff Loveness is an American screenwriter, television producer, actor, and comic book writer who has worked on the television series Jimmy Kimmel Live! and Rick and Morty, as well as the Marvel Cinematic Universe films Ant-Man and the Wasp: Quantumania (2023) and Avengers: The Kang Dynasty (2025).

Career
Loveness graduated from Pepperdine University with a Bachelor of Fine Arts in 2010. He started his career by writing several television episodes for Jimmy Kimmel Live! and Miracle Workers. He later gained notability for writing four season four Rick and Morty episodes. Soon after, he was hired by Marvel Studios to write the screenplay for Ant-Man and the Wasp: Quantumania. In December 2020, Loveness revealed that he had turned in the first draft of the script, and said Marvel had used the COVID-19 pandemic break to "do something new and weird" with the film. He came back in 2021 to write the Rick and Morty season 5 opening episode "Mort Dinner Rick Andre" and the finale, "Rickmurai Jack", which is his final episode of the show. In September 2022, Loveness was confirmed to work again with Marvel Studios by writing the screenplay for Avengers: The Kang Dynasty.

In March 2015, Loveness wrote a comic series centered around the Marvel Comics character Groot, alongside artist Brian Kesinger. In May 2017, he wrote several comic issues centered around other Marvel characters, including Nova and Spider-Man.

Filmography

Accolades

Bibliography

Aftershock Comics 

 World Reader #1-6

Boom! Studios 

 Judas #1-4
 Strange Skies Over East Berlin #1-4

DC Comics 

 Justice League (vol. 4) #51-52
 Mysteries of Love in Space #1 (Lois Lane & Superman: Glasses story)
 Shazam! (vol. 3) #12, 15
 Tales from the Dark Multiverse: Death of Superman #1

Marvel Comics 
 Amazing Spider-Man Annual #42 (The Many Costumes of Spider-Man story)
 Amazing Spider-Man (vol. 6) #6 (Spidey Meets Jimmy story)
 Amazing Spider-Man Special / Inhuman Special / All-New Captain America Special
 Avengers: No More Bullying #1 (Weird story)
 Death of Wolverine: Life After Logan #1 (You story)
 Groot (vol. 1) #1-6
 Marvel Super Hero Adventures: Captain Marvel - Halloween Spooktacular #1 (Sanctum Spooktorum story)
 Marvel Super Hero Adventures: Spider-Man - Web of Intrigue #1 (The More The Merrier story)
 Miles Morales: Spider-Man #30 (The Best Part story, with Phil Lord, Christopher Miller and Kemp Powers)
 Nova (vol. 7) #1-7
 Venom Annual #1 (Nobody Does It Better story)

References

External links
 

21st-century American comedians
21st-century American male writers
21st-century American screenwriters
American comedy writers
American comics writers
American male screenwriters
American male television writers
American satirists
American television writers
Living people
DC Comics people
Marvel Comics people
Marvel Comics writers
American parodists
Pepperdine University alumni
Place of birth missing (living people)
Primetime Emmy Award winners
Year of birth missing (living people)